Pterophorus denticulata is a moth of the family Pterophoridae. It known from New Guinea and Micronesia.

The length of the forewings is about 9 mm.

Taxonomy
Some authors treat is as a synonym of Pterophorus niveus.

External links
Insects of Micronesia Volume 9, no. 3 Lepidoptera: Pterophoridae
Review of the Pterophoridae from New Guinea, with descriptions of eight new species (Lepidoptera)

denticulata
Moths described in 1963